State Route 320 (SR 320) is a west-east state highway located entirely in Hamilton County in southeastern Tennessee. it traverses mainly the eastern portions of the county, including Chattanooga’s eastern outskirts and the census designated place of East Brainerd.

Route description 
SR 320 is known as East Brainerd Road its entire length, and begins at an intersection with Lee Highway (US 11/64/SR 2) near the Chattanooga Metropolitan Airport. From here SR 320 travels eastward as a two lane road to traverse I-75/US 74’s Exit 3 interchange, where it widens to five lanes, including a center turn lane. SR 320 continues eastward through the community of East Brainerd, before ending at a four way intersection with SR 321 just south of Collegedale. TDOT has been working since 2015 to widen the route to four lanes to this point, and some of this project is already complete. Although the state route designation ends at this point, a county maintained road also labeled as East Brainerd Road continues east to SR 317 in Apison, and some maps show this portion as part of SR 320.

Major intersections

See also

References
Mileage retrieved from DeLorme Street Atlas USA 
Official Tennessee Highway Maps

External links
Tennessee Department of Transportation

320
320
320